16 Prince Street is a Category B listed building in Peterhead, Aberdeenshire, Scotland. It dates from 1838. It was formerly Peterhead's infant school, colloquially known as the Chuckney School. Today it is an office building for Aberdeenshire Council.

Described by architectural historians David Walker and Matthew Woodworth as "a temple to education", the building's front elevation presents a single symmetrical storey, made of granite ashlar and with a central portico in the Roman Doric style, the pediment of which is surmounted by a bellcote. Extending to either side of this are wings of three bays. It was originally T-plan in shape, with a third wing extending back from the entrance, but has been greatly extended since its construction.

Further reading

See also
List of listed buildings in Peterhead, Aberdeenshire

References

Category B listed buildings in Aberdeenshire
Prince Street 16
Defunct schools in Aberdeenshire
Defunct primary schools in Scotland
1838 establishments in Scotland